Beyond the Sky may refer to:

 Beyond the Sky (film), a 2018 American science fiction film
 "Beyond the Sky", a track on 2006 Quasi album When the Going Gets Dark
 Beyond the Sky, American band formed by Ryan Cabrera

See also